Ocean Road Cancer Institute (ORCI) is a public, specialized, tertiary care medical facility owned by the Tanzania Ministry of Health and Social Welfare. It is the largest comprehensive cancer center in the country.

Location
The facility is located in Ilala District, in Dar es Salaam, Dar es Salaam Region, in Tanzania's capital and largest city. The geographical coordinates of the institute are: 6°48'39.0"S, 39°17'47.0"E (Latitude:-6.810833; Longitude:39.296389).

Overview
ORCI is a cancer treatment, research, and teaching center, affiliated with the Muhimbili University of Health and Allied Sciences and with Muhimbili National Hospital, the teaching hospital of the university. ORCI maintains an inpatient facility with capacity of 256 beds.

In Tanzania, an estimated 35,000 new cases of cancer were diagnosed in 2014, of whom about 21,000 (60 percent) died, the same year. The country has only two cancer hospitals, with the main one, ORCI, located in the capital, Dar es Salaam. Approximately 150 outpatients are attended to at ORCI, on a daily basis. At the institute, it is estimated that about 90 percent of the patients arrive when it's too late for a cure.

History
This health facility was founded in 1895 by the German colonial government. In the beginning, the hospital catered exclusively for German community. After the First World War, the British Colonial government reserved the hospital for serving the European communities.

After independence in 1961, the hospital was renamed the Ocean Road Hospital, and all racial restrictions were removed. Ocean Road Hospital became the maternity wing of Muhimbili Medical Centre. In 1980, the facility was converted into a cancer treatment unit. The Radiotherapy Unit of the Faculty of Medicine, University of Dar es Salaam was shifted from Muhimbili Medical Centre to the Ocean Road Hospital.

In June 1996, Ocean Road Hospital was made an independent autonomous institute directly under the Tanzanian Ministry of Health and its name changed to Ocean Road Cancer Institute.

In 2019, the hospital expanded its external beam radiotherapy services to include two linear accelerators in addition to its Cobalt-60 machine and brachytherapy services.

Currently, plans are underway to install the first PET-CT scan in the country.

ORCI also researches and treats viral diseases, including HIV/AIDS and Hepatitis B.

International collaboration
The international organizations with collaborative projects with Ocean Road Cancer Institute include, but are not limited to the following:

 National Cancer Institute: Bethesda, Maryland, USA
 International Atomic Energy Agency: Vienna, Austria
 World Health Organization, Geneva, Switzerland 
 International Agency for Research on Cancer: Lyons, France
 Union for International Cancer Control: Geneva, Switzerland 
 International Network for Cancer Treatment and Research: Brussels, Belgium
 International Association for Hospice and Palliative Care: Houston, Texas
 ICAP at Columbia University: New York City
 University of Copenhagen.

See also
 List of hospitals in Tanzania
 Bugando Medical Centre

References

External links
 Website of Ocean Road Cancer Institute
 About Ocean Road Cancer Institute

Medical research institutes in Tanzania
Buildings and structures in Dar es Salaam
1895 establishments in German East Africa
Hospital buildings completed in 1895
Hospitals in Tanzania
Cancer organisations based in Tanzania